In astrology, a decan is the subdivision of a sign.  In order to give fuller interpretation to the zodiac signs, ancient astrologers subdivided each sign into periods of approximately ten days. These divisions are known as the "decans" or "decantes" and cover modifications of individual traits, attributed to minor planetary influences, which temper or blend with the ruling influence of the period. The ten-day spans are somewhat arbitrary in order to allow for the five (and sometimes six) extra days in the year beyond the 360 days required for the thirty-six decans.

In modern times, however, the assignment of decans has changed considerably. Each sign is allocated a triplicity, consisting of three of the four classical elements air, water, earth or fire, and is therefore subdivided into three equal parts of 10 degrees each; these parts are referred to as decans or decanates.

Each decan of a sign is assigned rulership by the planet ruling the sign and secondary rulership by the planet ruling the decan.

In Ptolemy
The decans and their rulers are assigned as follows as based on the description by the Alexandrian Egyptian astrologer, Ptolemy, from whose Tetrabiblos are derived most of the principles of western astrology:

Traditional Chaldean rulerships

* as used as an essential dignity in astrology.

Notice that rulerships follow a repeating pattern, the Chaldaean order of the planets: Saturn, Jupiter, Mars, Sun, Venus, Mercury, Moon. This planetary order, in which the Sun stands at the center of the continuum, with the planets between the Sun and the Earth on one side and the outer planets on the other side, reflected the perception of the speed of each planet's motion as seen from the Earth.

Modern rulerships
Modern astrology updates the rulerships. Decans or "faces" are the least important of the essential dignities, representing about one-fifteenth of a planet's overall strength in medieval astrology.

The decans and their rulers are assigned as follows as based on the concepts of modern Western astrology :

See also
 Decans in the Chinese zodiac

Citations

References

Further reading

External links
Decan meanings, from Three Books of Occult Philosophy by Henry Cornelius Agrippa and Astrolabium Planum by Johannes Engel.
3rd Decan Aries Talisman Example of decan talisman using traditional astrology.

Technical factors of Western astrology